The Inland Empire (IE) is a metropolitan area and region inland of and adjacent to coastal Southern California, centering around the cities of San Bernardino and Riverside, and bordering Los Angeles County to the west. The bulk of the population is centered in the cities of northwestern Riverside County and southwestern San Bernardino County, and is considered to include the desert communities of the Coachella and Victor Valleys, respectively on the other sides of the San Gorgonio Pass and San Bernardino Mountains from the Santa Ana River watershed that forms the bulk of the Inland Empire; a much broader definition includes all of Riverside and San Bernardino counties. The combined land area of the counties of the Inland Empire is larger than ten U.S. states—West Virginia, Maryland, Hawaii, Massachusetts, Vermont, New Hampshire, New Jersey, Connecticut, Delaware and Rhode Island. 

Most of the area's population is in southwestern San Bernardino County and northwestern Riverside County. At the end of the 19th century, the Inland Empire was a major center of agriculture, including citrus, dairy, and winemaking. Agriculture declined through the 20th century, and since the 1970s a rapidly growing population, fed by families migrating in search of affordable housing, has led to more residential, industrial, and commercial development.

Etymology

The term "Inland Empire" is documented to have been used by the Riverside Enterprise newspaper (now The Press-Enterprise) as early as April 1914. Developers in the area likely introduced the term to promote the region and to highlight the area's unique features. Originally, this area was called the Orange Empire due to the acres of citrus groves that once extended from Pasadena to Redlands during the first half of the twentieth century. The boundaries of the Inland Empire are nebulous, but the region is generally defined as the cities of western Riverside County and southwestern San Bernardino County, adjacent to the Los Angeles metropolitan area. A broader definition includes Palm Springs and the surrounding desert communities, and a much widerspread definition includes all of San Bernardino and Riverside counties.

History

What is now known as the Inland Empire was inhabited for thousands of years, prior to the late eighteenth century, by the Tongva, Serrano, and Cahuilla Native Americans. With Spanish colonization and the subsequent Mexican era the area was sparsely populated at the land grant Ranchos, considering it unsuitable for missions. The first American settlers, a group of Mormon pioneers, arrived over the Cajon Pass in 1851. Although the Mormons left a scant six years later, recalled to Salt Lake City by Brigham Young during the church's Utah War with the U.S. government, other settlers soon followed.

The entire landmass of Southern California was subdivided according to the San Bernardino Meridian, which was first plotted as part of the Public Land Survey System in November 1852, by Col. Henry Washington. Base Line Road, a major thoroughfare, today runs from Highland to San Dimas, intermittently along the absolute baseline coordinates plotted by Col. Washington. San Bernardino County was first formed out of parts of Los Angeles County on April 26, 1853. While the partition once included what is today most of Riverside County, the region is not as monolithic as it may sound. Rivalries between Colton, Redlands, Riverside and San Bernardino over the location of the county seat in the 1890s caused each of them to form their own civic communities, each with their own newspapers. On August 14, 1893, the state Senate allowed Riverside County to form out of land previously in San Bernardino and San Diego counties, after rejecting a bill for Pomona to split from L.A. County and become the seat of what would have been called San Antonio County.

The arrival of rail and the importation of navel and Valencia orange trees in the 1870s touched off explosive growth, with the area quickly becoming a major center for citrus production. This agricultural boom continued with the arrival of water from the Colorado River and the rapid growth of Los Angeles in the early twentieth century, with dairy farming becoming another staple industry. In 1926, Route 66 (now known as Foothill Boulevard and Interstate 215) came through the northern parts of the area, bringing a stream of tourists and migrants to the region. Still, the region endured as the key part of the Southern California "citrus belt" until the end of World War II, when a new generation of real-estate developers bulldozed acres of agricultural land to build suburbs. The precursor to the San Bernardino Freeway, the Ramona Expressway, was built in 1944, and further development of the freeway system in the area facilitated the expansion of suburbs and human migration throughout the Inland Empire and Southern California.

The region experienced significant economic and population growth through most of the latter half of the twentieth century. In the early 1990s, the loss of the region's military bases and reduction of nearby defense industries due to the end of the Cold War led to a local economic downturn. The region as a whole had partially recovered from this downturn by the start of the twenty-first century through the development of warehousing, shipping, logistics and retail industries, primarily centered around Ontario. However, these industries were heavily affected by the Great Recession.

Geography

Physical geography

Physical boundaries between Los Angeles and the Inland Empire from west to east are the San Jose Hills splitting the San Gabriel Valley from the Pomona Valley, leading to the urban populations centered in the San Bernardino Valley. From the south to north, the Santa Ana Mountains physically divide Orange County from Riverside County. The Santa Rosa Mountains, as well as the Southern California portion of the Sonoran Desert, physically divide Riverside County from San Diego County. Some definitions for the IE include the Chino Valley, Coachella Valley, Cucamonga Valley, Menifee Valley, Murrieta Valley, Perris Valley, San Jacinto Valley, Temecula Valley, and Victor Valley.

The San Bernardino mountains are home to the San Bernardino National Forest and the resort communities of Big Bear Lake, Lake Arrowhead, and Running Springs. The Santa Ana River extends from Mt. San Gorgonio for nearly  through San Bernardino, Riverside, and Orange counties before it eventually spills into the Pacific Ocean at Newport Beach and Huntington Beach. While temperatures are generally cool to cold in the mountains, it can get hot in the valleys.

Political geography
Unlike most metropolitan areas that have grown up around a central city, the Inland Empire has no one main focus city. Major cities in the region include Riverside, San Bernardino, Rancho Cucamonga, Ontario, and Corona. Suburban sprawl spreads out to form a connection with the Los Angeles metropolitan area. Further development is steadily, if not heavily, encroaching past the mountains into the outlying desert areas. The Inland Empire borders both Los Angeles and Orange counties. Freeways in Southern California are heavily used, but this comprehensive freeway system has made travel between the Inland Empire and these two counties generally direct, especially to and from Los Angeles County.

The Inland Empire has also been referred to as the 909, after one of the region's most used area codes. In 2004, because of growing demand for telephone numbers, most of western Riverside County was granted a second area code, 951, which is overlayed with the 909 area code (they have the same physical boundaries and new telephone subscribers likely receive a 951 area code telephone number).

The Coachella Valley region of Palm Springs, Palm Desert, and Indio is located much farther east in Riverside County (the distance between the city of San Bernardino and Palm Springs is approximately 50 miles) and is part of the much larger 760 area code. This area is sometimes considered a sub-region of the Inland Empire or its own separate region. This is to help differentiate it from the urbanized area containing the cities of San Bernardino and Riverside.

The RPA definition includes the Inland Empire (San Bernardino–Riverside) in the Southern California Megaregion, alongside Anaheim, Bakersfield, Huntington Beach, Long Beach, Los Angeles, San Diego, the geographically separate Las Vegas Valley, as well as the Tijuana area in Mexico. Orange County and San Diego County are completely encompassed within the megaregion.

Boundaries and definitions
There is no universally accepted definition for the boundaries of the Inland Empire region. Some sources such as the Los Angeles Times have referred to Riverside County and San Bernardino County as the Inland Empire, mirroring the Riverside-San Bernardino-Ontario metropolitan area.

Some residents of certain areas, such as Twentynine Palms or the Coachella and Temecula valleys, may consider themselves separate from the IE. The California Travel and Tourism Commission (CTTC), a not-for-profit, nongovernmental entity that promotes tourism in California, divides the state into several regions for its own purposes. The CTTC defines the Inland Empire as being bounded by Los Angeles County and Orange County on the west and San Diego County on the south, stretching as far north as the Victor Valley area and as far east as Idyllwild in the San Jacinto Mountains. The state of California's official website links to the CTTC's map with the description "Map of the Inland Empire region".

Other sources, including Kevin Starr, former state librarian of California, include the eastern Los Angeles County cities of the Pomona Valley, such as Claremont, Pomona, La Verne, San Dimas, and Diamond Bar. Other sources also include cities in Los Angeles County within the boundaries.

Economy

Inexpensive land prices (compared with Los Angeles and Orange counties), a large supply of vacant land, and a transport network where many highways and railroads intersect have made the Inland Empire a major shipping hub. Some of the nation's largest manufacturing companies have chosen the Inland Empire for their distribution facilities including Toyota Motor Corporation's North American Parts and Logistics Distribution (NAPLD) center in Ontario and APL Logistics in Rancho Cucamonga. In 2007, Whirlpool Corporation leased a  distribution center in Perris that is larger than 31 football fields but, more recently, 5,000,000 sqft warehouses are common. These centers operate as part of the system that transports finished goods and materials from the ports of Los Angeles and Long Beach to destinations to the north and east such as Las Vegas, Phoenix, and Denver. More than 80 percent of the state's imported cargo is shipped through the Los Angeles/Inland Empire Corridor. During the late 2010s and early 2020s, Amazon, the largest private employer in the region, has rapidly expanded its facilities and warehouses there, responding to explosive growth in online retailing and shipping and increasing traffic and air pollution.
  
Like most industrial areas, the Inland Empire is vulnerable to the effects of economic recessions. For example, during the global economic downturn of 2008–2009, industrial vacancies doubled from 6.2 percent in 2007 to 12.4 percent to 2008. In San Bernardino and Redlands, vacancies reached 22 percent.
  
The Inland Empire area is one of the least educated areas of the state with the lowest average in annual wages in the country. A 2006 study of salaries in 51 metropolitan areas of the country ranked the Inland Empire second to last, with an average annual wage of $36,924. Nonetheless, inexpensive land prices and innovative institutional support networks have attracted some small businesses and technology startups into the area.

While urbanization continues to cut into agricultural lands, the Inland Empire still produces substantial crops. Although  of irrigated land was lost between 2002 and 2004, agriculture still brought in more than $1.6 billion in revenues to the two-county region in 2006.

Being a MSA, aggregate GDP figures are reported by the Bureau of Economic Analysis annually. The Inland Empire ranks 25th in the nation with a 2011 GDP of $109.8 billion, roughly a third of San Francisco–Oakland–Berkeley, CA Metropolitan Statistical Area despite their close population numbers. Per capita GDP was $25,993.34 in 2011, nearly half among the nation's top 50 Gross Metropolitan Product. Due to the housing crisis, the GDP fell from $114.8 billion in 2007, despite a heavy influx of residents.

The unemployment rate in the Inland Empire has been consistently over the national average since 2007. 10.4 percent of Inland residents were unemployed as of August 2013, compared with the national rate of 7.3 percent. Due to the high unemployment and housing foreclosure rates, a higher percentage of Inland residents rely on public assistance. According to the Press-Enterprise, "twelve percent of Riverside County and 17 percent of San Bernardino County residents used food stamps in January 2012", as compared with "11 percent of those living in Los Angeles County, 8 percent of San Diego County residents and 7 percent of Orange County residents".

Housing

Since the 1950s, the area has changed from a rural to a suburban environment. The region now comprises numerous cities known as bedroom communities that are suburban cities to Los Angeles, Orange County, and San Diego. Affordable home ownership is the primary motivation behind the growth in these Inland Empire cities as homes in the region are generally less expensive than comparable homes in Los Angeles and Orange counties, but the pricing gap continues to shrink each year due to migration and increasing population. This low-density development has caused sprawl in the Inland Empire. Additionally, land that was used for agriculture is now being sold by owners for conversion to shopping centers, industrial warehouses, and more. Due to the lack of one central city in the Inland Empire, and the smaller geographical footprint that suburban cities tend to have, this continuous development has become seemingly unplanned suburban sprawl as local interest and zoning laws may quickly change from one city to the next city. The Inland Empire was declared the nation's worst example of sprawl according to a study by Smart Growth America in 2002.

During the housing bubble collapse of the late 2000s, foreclosures rose by 3,500 percent. In 2010, the area ranked fourth in the nation in the number of foreclosures, with one filing for every 133 households. The problem of abandoned homes became so great that the city of Perris initiated a program to paint the brown lawns of abandoned homes green as a way to reduce the appearance of blight.

In 2019, the "bedroom community" nature of the Inland Empire led to a plan to increase the construction of new housing in coastal cities (known as "job centers") preferentially versus building more housing in the Inland Empire areas.  Meghan Sahli-Wells, mayor of Culver City, said that she supported the coastal plan because of the urgent nature of climate change.  However, the plan was described as "toothless".

The attractiveness of Inland Empire cities for warehousing and logistics has resulted in warehouses being built incrementally closer and closer to residential areas.  With air pollution from diesel-powered transport trucks being a serious and cumulative concern for human health, an effort was made to impose a 1,000-foot buffer zone (separation distance between residential and commercial land uses) for new construction.  However, this effort was not successful, due to local municipal officials giving priority to maximizing the construction of both housing and warehouse facilities, with the goal of maximizing employment as well as property-tax revenue from both the residential and the commercial/industrial sectors.

Retail
Retailing in the area has increased to try to keep abreast with the growing suburban population. The region is home to several large shopping malls, including the Promenade Shops at Dos Lagos and the Crossings in Corona; Ontario Mills in Ontario; Promenade Mall in Temecula; Galleria at Tyler, Riverside Plaza, and Canyon Crossings in Riverside; The Shoppes at Chino Hills in Chino Hills; Moreno Valley Mall in Moreno Valley; Victoria Gardens in Rancho Cucamonga and the Inland Center mall in San Bernardino. In fiscal year 2006, retail sales in San Bernardino County grew by 11.9 percent to $31.2 billion, while sales in Riverside County were up 11.3 percent to $29.6 billion.

Environmental quality

The result of this ongoing development has resulted in greater homeownership for the region. Although the region saw an uptick in jobs over the past decade, it is not a heavy employment center, and many residents commute to Los Angeles and Orange counties for their work. With a lack of substantial public transportation in the Greater Los Angeles Area, this has led to traffic congestion and degradation in air quality for the Inland Empire. The solution to these problems is not simple. The presence of so many city governments within the Inland Empire, which often have different 'visions' for their own municipalities, means that two cities in the region rarely agree on a solution; just as common, they may have unequal means for implementing one even if they were to agree. Having no region-wide governmental planning organization may undermine any solution that could be proposed. Lastly, the fast pace at which development occurs versus the limited ability of government to respond to changes means that it could easily take years, if not decades, for a viable solution (such as new roads, transit systems, or pollution controls) to go into effect.

Air pollution
Air pollution, or suspended particulate matter locally generated from the increased number of automobiles in the area, from point sources such as factories, dust carried into the air by construction activity, and the contribution of similar pollutants from the Los Angeles area has regularly caused the Inland Empire to be at, or near, the bottom of many air quality ratings. In 2004, the EPA rated the San Bernardino-Riverside area as having the worst particulate air pollution in the United States.

Water pollution
Water pollution has also been found in the Santa Ana River and Cajon wash, and pollutants from the March Air Reserve Base and Stringfellow Acid Pits have contaminated groundwater in parts of Riverside County. In 1997, perchlorate, a chemical used to produce explosives, was discovered to be seeping into the groundwater under Rialto in a plume that continues to grow. In 2007, the Rialto city council petitioned the United States Environmental Protection Agency (EPA) for Superfund status to clean up the origin site. The sites comprising March Air Reserve Base, Norton Air Force Base and the Stringfellow Acid Pits have already been classified as EPA Superfund toxic waste sites.

Transportation

Traffic congestion is a major issue in the Inland Empire. Many of the existing freeways were completed in the late 1970s with the exception of the segment of the Foothill Freeway, State Route 210 (SR 210) between San Dimas and San Bernardino, which was completed in July 2007. New freeways or highway "fix-ups" are either in progress or being planned, such as the construction of Mid County Parkway between Perris and San Jacinto or the addition of toll lanes on I-15 through heavily urbanized portions of Riverside and San Bernardino counties. Other problems exist, however, including the imbalance between housing and job availability. The Inland Empire population grew as a result of affordable housing, at least relative to the rest of Southern California, but most of the higher paying jobs are located in Los Angeles, San Diego and Orange counties. Thus, many workers must commute daily from the Inland Empire to their jobs in these counties—sometimes up to two hours each direction—and even longer if by public transportation. As the population increases, the problem is most certainly going to get worse. Forbes magazine ranked the area first in its 2007 list of most unhealthy commutes in the United States, beating out every other metropolitan area in the country, as Inland area drivers breathe the unhealthiest air and have the highest rate of fatal auto accidents per capita.

According to a 1999 report by the Surface Transportation Policy Project, the Inland Empire leads in fatal crashes caused by road rage. The theft of copper, brass and other metals from highway and road fixtures has also led to decreased public safety on IE roads and freeways. Gas siphoning has also been noted as a problem for vehicles left unattended in the region.

Public transportation

The Inland Empire does not have a particularly extensive or robust public transportation system. Due to the large physical size and sprawl of the region, the primary means of transportation in the region is the automobile. Less than five percent of the IE's 1,249,224 working-age residents use public transportation to get to work.

Omnitrans is the largest bus agency in San Bernardino County, while the Riverside Transit Agency (RTA) is the largest in Riverside County. Currently, some of Omnitrans' bus routes run on headways of an hour or more, and some routes stop service in the early evening or may not run on weekends. SunLine Transit Agency provides bus service in the Coachella Valley while the Victor Valley Transit Authority (VVTA) provides transit service in the High Desert, including to Barstow after the transit systems in the latter was merged into VVTA in 2015. Other operators in the region include Pass Transit serving the Banning Pass area, Needles Area Transit serving the city of Needles, Mountain Transit serving the communities in the San Bernardino Mountains including Lake Arrowhead, Big Bear, Running Springs, and Crestline, and the MBTA serving the Morongo Basin and Yucca Valley portions of San Bernardino County.

Although transit usage and infrastructure remains weak, several projects have moved forward and opened in the 2010s to improve transit accessibility in the region. Major projects include the Perris Valley portion of the Metrolink 91/Perris Valley Line, the San Bernardino Transit Center, and the Omnitrans sbX Green Line, which connects the cities of Loma Linda and San Bernardino, two universities, and the Loma Linda VA Hospital to the San Bernardino Transit Center. In addition to sbX, there are other express services available to public transportation users in the region. RTA operates a BRT-lite system in the RapidLink Gold Line, which runs from UCR to the Corona Transit Center.

Due to the physical size of the Inland Empire, transit connections between the nodes of the region are primarily served by freeway express services. Transit operators of the IE provide service between major destinations and transit centers around Southern California including the San Bernardino Transit Center, the Montclair Transcenter, Disneyland, Pomona, and Oceanside.

The region is also part of the five-county Southern California Regional Rail Authority (SCRRA) "Metrolink" commuter rail system. Of the seven lines that Metrolink operates, four of them directly serve the Inland Empire:

 San Bernardino Line: provides daily service from San Bernardino to Los Angeles (busiest route of the system)
 91/Perris Valley Line: provides weekday service from Perris to Los Angeles and weekend service between Riverside and Los Angeles
 Riverside Line: provides weekday commuter service from downtown Riverside to Los Angeles
 Inland Empire-Orange County Line: provides daily service from San Bernardino to Oceanside in San Diego County

Future projects 

Although a robust transit network has been lacking in the region for decades, steps are being made toward developing one in the future. The councils of governments and transportation commissions in both IE counties have identified and are working on future expansions of transit to better serve the region. These include the sbX West Valley Connector, Arrow, the extension of the Gold Line to Montclair, and daily train service to the Coachella Valley. Additional routes have also been studied including extending the Metrolink's Perris Valley Line to San Jacinto and Temecula, a passenger rail spur along I-15 to Lake Elsinore, BRT routes throughout the respective service areas of Omnitrans and RTA, and an aerial tram from Highland to Big Bear.

The Inland Empire is the chosen route for connecting California High-Speed Rail service to San Diego. While a final alignment has yet to be finalized, concepts include stops at the Ontario International Airport, in Riverside, San Bernardino, Corona, and Temecula or Murrieta. These would occur as part of Phase II, however, which currently remains unfunded.

Airports
Several airports are located in the Inland Empire. San Bernardino International Airport, Ontario International Airport and Palm Springs International Airport are commercial airports in their respective cities. A local joint powers agency has redeveloped the decommissioned Norton Air Force Base into San Bernardino International Airport. There are also several general aviation airports in the region.

Active transportation 
The region is making some progress in developing dedicated bicycle commuter and recreation trails. The largest of these, the Santa Ana River bicycle path, currently connects Corona to Huntington Beach, and is eventually projected to stretch for 84 miles all the way to Redlands when completed. A shorter trail exists along the former path of the Pacific Electric Railway from Claremont to Rialto. A number of communities have also built trails along the levees and maintenance roads of other waterways in the region, including the CV Link, which is under construction in the Coachella Valley area of the region. Other plans also exist to provide feeder trails to meet the main backbones such as the PE Trail and provide a network of connectivity to nonmotorized users throughout the region.

Demographics

The population of the Greater Los Angeles area (which includes the Inland Empire) is about 18 million people according to the 2010 United States Census, and is the second largest metropolitan region in the country. The Metropolitan Statistical Area population of the Inland Empire (Riverside-San Bernardino-Ontario, CA Metropolitan Statistical Area) itself is more than 4.2 million people and is the 13th largest metropolitan area in the United States. According to the 2000 U.S. Census, it is the fastest growing area in the state. Between 1990 and 2000, Riverside and San Bernardino counties added 700,000 to their population totals, an increase of 26 percent. Between 2000 and 2010 Inland Empire's population expanded by 970,000 or 30 percent, and between 2010 and 2020 it expanded by a further 375,000 or another 9 percent to reach 4.6 million. According to census bureau's 2005–2007 estimates 61.8 percent of the population was White (40.4 percent White Non-Hispanic), 7.5 percent Black, 5.7 percent Asian and 25.0 percent of other or mixed race. 43.9 percent were Hispanic of any race. 21.9 percent of the population was foreign born.

The Centers for Disease Control and Prevention reports that in 2006, 33.1 percent of people in the Greater San Bernardino Area were overweight, and 30.8 percent were obese. Forbes magazine ranks the area as the fourth fattest in the country.

A substantial majority of residents (76.6 percent), last comparatively surveyed in 2001, rated their respective counties as good places to live. Over 81 percent of Riverside County residents indicated that their county is a very good or fairly good place to live, while about 72 percent of residents in San Bernardino County felt the same way. Survey respondents cited "nice living area", "good climate", and "affordable housing" as the top positive factors in assessing their respective communities. Smog was by far the most important negative factor affecting respondents' ratings in both counties, while traffic was the second highest concern in Riverside County and crime the second highest concern among San Bernardino County residents.

Since the 1970s and onwards, large numbers of African-American, Latino and some Asian-American residents from the Los Angeles-Orange County and San Diego metro areas moved to the Inland Empire region. Large Black communities can be found around San Bernardino (Fontana and Rialto) and Riverside (Moreno Valley and Perris), where Blacks and Latinos became majorities in and around those cities. This is also true in the Mojave Desert and Coachella Valley portions.

Politics
While the region as a whole had traditionally leaned more Republican than the rest of California, newer residents are less likely to identify with the Republican party than longer-term residents (36 percent to 42 percent), and the total number of residents identifying with the Democrats (34 percent) slightly edged over the number identifying with the Republican party (33 percent).

In the 2008 presidential election, Democratic candidate Barack Obama carried both Riverside and San Bernardino counties, becoming only the second Democrat to carry both counties since Lyndon Johnson in 1964. In 2012, Obama repeated this feat and again carried both counties, and the two Inland Empire counties have stayed in the Democratic column in presidential elections since. Nonetheless, the area continues to be far friendlier to Republicans than Los Angeles County or the San Francisco Bay Area.

Non-Hispanic Whites and non-Hispanic Blacks have the highest participation rates for nearly every type of political activity, while Latinos and Asian Americans lag significantly behind those groups in terms of volunteerism and organizational membership. The 2006 immigration protests have significantly boosted political participation among Latinos.

Religion

Many faiths and denominations are found and represented in the area. The Roman Catholic parishes in the region belong to the church's Diocese of San Bernardino.

Mormons and Seventh-day Adventists have communities in the towns of Loma Linda and Redlands near San Bernardino. Mormons also have congregations in the High Desert region. Seventh-day Adventists operate Loma Linda University.

The Inland Empire has a Jewish community, and additionally a Jewish American community is in and around the Sun City neighborhood of Menifee. According to the United Jewish Citizens of the Desert, the Coachella Valley has an estimated 20,000 American Jews, one of California's largest Jewish communities, as a result of being a major retirement destination.

There are also some fast-growing Muslim communities with around 30,000 American Muslims in 2019, mostly concentrated around the UCR campus in Riverside, Irvine and central Corona. All locations have well-established Islamic Centers gathering faith members for weekly Juma prayers as well as other Islamic holidays.

Crime
While the crime index in Riverside and Ontario trends slightly over the state average, San Bernardino has a crime index consistently near or over twice that of the national average. Reflecting nationwide trends, violent crime in the region overall declined or remained consistent in 2009, despite the recession. In the city of Riverside, 10 homicides occurred in 2005, down from 24 in 2003, its highest total since 2003. All but three cases resulted in arrests. In San Bernardino, by contrast, 58 killings occurred in 2005, but only a third of cases in San Bernardino led to arrests, due to a lack of witness cooperation in that city.

Latino gangs have been active in the region since the area's citrus days while a continual migration of numerous African American gangs from the inner city of South LA have flowed into the region since the Watts Riots and 1992 Los Angeles Riots. The increased diversity in the region between 1990 and 2000 is also associated with a 20 percent increase in hate crime in the same period, mostly ascribed to increased gang activity. According to data from the FBI's Uniform Crime Reporting program, taken together, Riverside and San Bernardino counties showed a total of 51,237 crimes reported to county police/sheriffs (but not to city or other agencies) in 2006; this combined total exceeded the totals for all other California counties – considered individually – except for Sacramento.

The region has also been noted as a center of methamphetamine drug production. The Riverside and San Bernardino county sheriffs' departments busted 635 meth labs in 2000; law enforcement has driven most of the meth production industry to Mexico since 2007, but many of the homes discovered to have been used as meth labs before 2006 have since been sold on the market before California law required rigorous decontamination, leading to a legacy of health hazards for unsuspecting renters and home-buyers in the area.

In 2016 federal crime statistics stated that San Bernardino was ranked the most dangerous city in California.

Education

There is a trend of lower educational attainment in the IE, which starts early. Only 37 percent of 3- and 4-year-olds in the region are enrolled in pre-school, with only one school in the region for every 343 children, as compared with 48 percent enrollment in San Diego County. Thirty-five percent of the IE's ninth graders do not graduate from high school, and only 37 percent of its college age residents enroll in a post-secondary education program of some sort. Only 24 percent of the IE's adult residents have attained a college degree or better. Twenty-five percent do not possess a high school diploma. According to past CSUSB President Al Karnig, "We have a very low college attendance rate that is scantly above half of what the average is in other states. We have only have about 20 percent college graduates in the Inland Empire while the average in other states is 38 percent." 21 inland area high schools rank in the top 100 in California for producing dropouts.

Of Inland Empire residents 25 years and over in 2004, 44.4 percent of Asians had bachelor's or higher degrees, and nearly 70 percent had at least attended college. 21.3 percent of Blacks had a bachelor's degree or higher, and 65.2 percent had either a community degree or had attended college. 22.8 percent of Whites had a bachelor's degree or higher, and 60.8 percent had attended college. Of Hispanics, 6.9 percent had a bachelor's or higher degree, and 30.2 percent attended college.

Among students transferring from Inland community colleges to private schools in 2004–05, the most frequent choice was the University of Phoenix.

Employment
While the Inland Empire led the state in job-growth with 275,000 new jobs between 1990 and 2000, most are in comparatively low-tech fields. San Bernardino and Riverside counties are primarily host to service and manufacturing- or warehousing-oriented industries. Food and administrative services employ the most people in the Inland Empire, while for the state of California, the top industries are in administrative services and professional, scientific and hi-tech-oriented fields. 79.8% of the IE's job growth from 1990 to 2003 was in service-sector jobs. Low-wage industries are abundant in the IE, and the area's high-tech and professional industries pay less than in other regions of California. As many as one-third of working adults commute out of the  region to find work, the highest proportion of any area in the country. Adding to gridlock, fewer than 5% of the IE's 1,249,224 working-age residents use public transportation to get to work each day. 14.5% carpool, while 79.7% typically drive alone to work in their cars.

In 2007, the region had an unemployment rate of 6.1%, while overall jobless claims in California were at 5.4% and 4.4% nationally. In 2008, unemployment in the area increased to 9.5%, at a time when the state average was 8.2% and the national average approximately 6.5%. Unemployment reached an all-time high of 15% in 2010, second in the nation only to Detroit among metropolitan areas with populations over 1 million.

Culture

The Inland Empire sits adjacent to the San Bernardino Mountains. Lake Arrowhead and Big Bear are just some of the lakes located in the mountains. Lake Arrowhead becomes very popular in the summertime, while Big Bear becomes popular in the winter for skiing and snowboarding activities. Various locations in the Inland Empire provide venues for cultural performances and entertainment. The Victoria Gardens Cultural Center, which is owned and operated by the City of Rancho Cucamonga, opened in the Fall of 2006 providing theatre, concerts and family entertainment to the region. The San Manuel Amphitheater in San Bernardino's Devore neighborhood is the nation's largest outdoor amphitheater. San Bernardino's "Route 66 Rendezvous (the largest classical carshow in the US)", an annual street fair and classic car show, draws a half-million people from around the world. The Palm Springs Aerial Tramway in Palm Springs is a popular attraction, rising to more than 8500 feet.

Music

Established bands from the IE include Alien Ant Farm, Hepcat, The Bellrays, and the Voodoo Glow Skulls, from Riverside, and Cracker from Redlands, and The Mountain Goats from Chino. House music artist DJ Lynnwood got his start at the age of ten spinning records at KUOR-FM in Redlands. girafa is another local electronic artist from Corona. Local hip-hop artists such as Miah Lanski, Suga Free, Saint Dog, 40 Glocc, Young Noble from the Outlawz, J.J. Fad, Raje, Noa James, Xydewayz8, The Faze, Lil Xan and A Lighter Shade of Brown have brought about attention to the growing Hip hop community in and around the region. The Jerkin' street dance culture originated from the Inland Empire-based hip-hop groups New Boyz and Audio Push. A number of artists associated with the Palm Desert Scene forged the genre of desert rock as well as playing a large role in the genre of stoner rock. A Danish record label, Musikministeriet, recently opened up an office in Redlands in hopes of further cultivating the IE music scene.

Frank Zappa performed in Upland on Foothill Boulevard during the early 1960s where he played shows on a makeshift stage for college crowds. Zappa also purchased Pal Recording Studio on Archibald Avenue in Rancho Cucamonga where the Surfaris had recorded the surf music classic "Wipe Out". He dubbed it Studio Z and began making recordings that eventually led to the founding of Zappa's group The Mothers of Invention. Until his death in December 2012, singer Ray Collins of the Mothers of Invention lived in the area. Zappa mentions the Inland Empire in the song "Billy the Mountain".

From the late 80s until the late 90s, many up-and-coming musical acts, such as Rage Against the Machine, Blink-182 and No Doubt cut their teeth playing venues in Riverside. These historic venues (Spanky's Cafe and the De Anza Theatre) have since been closed and converted to other purposes. The Barn at UCR was closed as a music venue for 10 years but beginning in October 2008 KUCR Radio 88.3 FM, ASPB The Associated Student Program Board with funding from UCR Housing began having a free concert series once a week during the school quarter. Emerging music venues in the IE include the Showcase Theatre in Corona (recently closed), Red Planet Records in Riverside, the Vault in Redlands, the Buffalo Inn and The Wire (now closed) in Upland, the Twins Club in Rancho Cucamonga, the Press Restaurant in Claremont, the Glass House in Pomona, Back To The Grind Coffee Shop in Riverside, Liam's Irish Pub in Colton, and CommonGround Soundstage in Riverside.

Performing arts

Orchestras in the IE include the Redlands Symphony, which performs at the University of Redlands, the Riverside County Philharmonic, which performs at the Riverside Municipal Auditorium, the San Bernardino Symphony, which performs at the California Theatre, and the Victor Valley Symphony, which performs at Victor Valley College. Theatrical Arts International is housed at the California Theatre as well. With the largest subscriber base in the Inland Empire, Theatrical Arts International presents the largest caliber tours available including such blockbusters as Cats, Hairspray, Mamma Mia, and Miss Saigon. There are many other large theater programs in the community. The Riverside Fox Theater, also known as the Fox Performing Arts Center, was built in 1929, and is a Spanish Colonial Revival style building in the heart of downtown Riverside, California. The theater is the centerpiece of Riverside's Arts & Culture initiative and underwent a major renovation and restoration to become a regional performing arts facility. Renovation was completed in the Fall 2009, with a grand-reopening in January 2010. At Chaffey High School in Ontario, they have a very large theater program that puts on shows in the fall and in the spring on one of the largest high school stages in the Inland Empire. The Inland Empire Harmony Carousel Chorus provides music in Barbershop Quartet productions.

Sports

The Inland Empire is the largest metropolitan area in the United States without a major professional sports team. However, it is part of the Greater Los Angeles area which includes teams in Los Angeles and Orange counties. The area is home to numerous minor league baseball, basketball, and ice hockey teams. The Inland Empire team with the most championships is the Inland Empire 66ers of San Bernardino, who won their most recent championship in 2013.

The Auto Club Speedway, located in Fontana, opened in 1997. It contains an oval, a road course, and a dragstrip for auto racing.

In college sports, the Inland Empire features five four-year institutions that represent all three NCAA divisions, as well as the NAIA.

Media

Newspapers

The Inland Empire is served by four major local newspapers:
 The InlandEmpirePress.com provides online only reporting for the Riverside County & San Bernardino Valley region.
 The San Bernardino County Sun, which serves primarily the San Bernardino Valley region.
 The Inland Valley Daily Bulletin, which serves the southwestern San Bernardino County and eastern Los Angeles County cities of Claremont, La Verne, Pomona, San Dimas, Upland, Rancho Cucamonga, Ontario, Montclair, Chino and Chino Hills.
 The Riverside-based Press-Enterprise also has a few editions over the area.
There is also an Inland Empire edition of the Los Angeles Times. For the segments of the Inland Empire surrounding San Bernardino and Riverside cities, regional newspapers include:
 Inland Empire: The Inland Empire Community News, provides online and print reporting for various cities in the Inland Empire.
 High Desert: the Victor Valley is served by both the Victor Valley News and the Daily Press. Other newspapers include the Antelope Valley Press, and the Barstow Desert Dispatch. Both Victorville and Barstow have a Sunday edition circulated across both areas called the Press-Dispatch.
 Palm Springs & Coachella Valley: The Desert Sun

Radio

The Inland Empire is ranked 26th (June 2008) in the national radio market as a stand-alone market. When combined with the Greater Los Angeles Area, it is part of the second largest radio market.

Due to the various mountain ranges including San Bernardino, San Gabriel, and Idyllwild, it may be difficult to receive a single station throughout the entire Inland Empire area without interference.

Television

PBS member station KVCR-TV broadcasts directly to the Inland Empire. The station covers all of Riverside County and San Bernardino County with some Los Angeles area overlap. The station is located on the campus of San Bernardino Valley College. In addition to PBS and original, local content, First Nations Experience (FNX), KVCR's sister station, also broadcasts programming about the indigenous peoples and Native Americans to the Inland Empire.

The current TLC TV series Dr. Pimple Popper, a spin-off of the YouTube channel of dermatologist Sandra Lee, is shot mainly at Skin Physicians & Surgeons, a clinic in Upland run by Lee and her husband Jeffrey Rebish, also a dermatologist.

Film
While there are no large film production companies or studios based in the Inland Empire, on-location shoots accounted for a total economic impact of $65.2 million in the two-county region in 2006. From 1994 to 2005, filming accounted for over a billion dollars ($1,228,977,456) in total revenues spent in the area. Some famous films shot in the Inland Empire include Executive Decision, U Turn, Erin Brockovich, and The Fast and the Furious. Select scenes from the films Tough Guys, Constantine, The Island, and Tenet were also shot in the Inland Empire's ghost town of Eagle Mountain.

While the 2006 David Lynch film Inland Empire is named after the region, no scenes were actually shot in the Inland Empire.

Ann Lerner, Albuquerque's film liaison, told the L.A. Times about the AMC cable TV series Breaking Bad producers wanted to film the series in California's Inland Empire but switched to New Mexico because of New Mexico's tax incentives.

Shot Caller has scenes set in the Inland Empire, called "I.E." in the film.

Incorporated cities

See also

 List of California urban areas
 List of museums in the Inland Empire (California)

References

External links
 
 

 
Regions of California
San Bernardino County, California
Riverside County, California
Southern California
Metropolitan areas of California